Stictoptera is a genus of moths of the family Noctuidae erected by Achille Guenée in 1852.

Description
Palpi slender and nearly naked, where the second joint reaching vertex of head and third joint long. Antennae very long and slender. Thorax smoothly scaled. Abdomen with dorsal tufts on proximal segments. Tibia slightly hairy. Forewings rather long and narrow with crenulate cilia. A small tuft of scales on the reniform can be seen. Frenulum of male very strong which is single in female.

Species
 Stictoptera aequisecta Turner, 1933
 Stictoptera anaemia Hampson, 1905
 Stictoptera antemarginata Saalmüller, 1880
 Stictoptera columba (Walker, 1856) (Himalaya, Thailand, Sundaland)
 Stictoptera confluens (Walker, 1858)
 Stictoptera conturbata (Walker, 1869)
 Stictoptera cucullioides Guenée, 1852
 Stictoptera esmeralda Holloway, 1976 (Borneo, Sumatra)
 Stictoptera ferrifera (Walker, 1864)
 Stictoptera gabri (Berio, 1970)
 Stictoptera grisea Moore, 1867(Himalaya, Sundaland, Philippines)
 Stictoptera griveaudi Laporte, 1970
 Stictoptera hironsi Barnett, Emms & Holloway, 1998
 Stictoptera macromma Snellen, 1880 (Indo-Australian tropics)
 Stictoptera melanistis Hampson, 1912
 Stictoptera pammeces Turner, 1920
 Stictoptera pectinata Kenrick, 1917
 Stictoptera poecilosoma Saalmüller, 1880
 Stictoptera rhabdota A. E. Prout, 1927
 Stictoptera semialba (Walker, 1864) Malaysia, Sumatra, Borneo)
 Stictoptera signifera (Walker, 1857)
 Stictoptera terribilis Holloway, 1976 (from Borneo)
 Stictoptera trajiciens Walker, 1857
 Stictoptera tridentifera Holloway 1979

References

 
 

Stictopterinae